Keurig Dr Pepper Inc., formerly Green Mountain Coffee Roasters (1981–2014) and Keurig Green Mountain (2014–2018), is a publicly traded American beverage and coffeemaker conglomerate with headquarters in Burlington, Massachusetts. Formed in July 2018 with the merger of Keurig Green Mountain and Dr Pepper Snapple Group (formerly Dr. Pepper/7up Inc.), Keurig Dr Pepper offers over 125 hot and cold beverages. The company's Canadian business unit subsidiary operates as Keurig Dr Pepper Canada (formerly Canada Dry Motts).

The company's east-coast division manufactures Keurig brewing systems; sources, produces, and sells coffee, hot cocoa, teas, and other beverages under various brands for its Keurig machines; and sells coffee beans and ground coffee in bags and fractional packs. As of 2018, the newly merged conglomerate also sells sodas, juices, and other soft drinks via its Dr Pepper Snapple division based in Texas.

Green Mountain Coffee Roasters (GMCR) was established in 1981. After regional and national expansion in the late 1980s, and an IPO in 1993, the company completed its acquisition of the brewing-machine manufacturer Keurig, Inc. in 2006, enabling rapid growth through the high-margin sales of its many varieties of single-serve K-Cup pods. In March 2014, GMCR changed its name to Keurig Green Mountain.

A publicly traded company from 1993 through 2015, Keurig Green Mountain was acquired by a group of investors led by JAB Holding Company in March 2016 for $13.9 billion in cash. Keurig Green Mountain became a privately held company for two years, and was an independent entity run by its pre-existing management team and a new CEO.

On July 9, 2018, Keurig Green Mountain acquired the Dr Pepper Snapple Group in an $18.7-billion deal. The combined company was renamed Keurig Dr Pepper, and traded publicly again on the New York Stock Exchange under the ticker "KDP" until 2020 when it switched to Nasdaq while retaining the same ticker. Shareholders of Dr Pepper Snapple Group own 13% of the combined company, with Keurig shareholder Mondelez International owning 13% to 14% of that fraction. JAB Holdings owns the remaining 73-74%.

On February 21, 2019, the company announced that they are building a second headquarters in Frisco, Texas.

History

Beginnings
Green Mountain Coffee Roasters (GMCR) began when entrepreneur Bob Stiller was near a Vermont ski resort, where he consumed a cup of coffee which he enjoyed and looked for its source. In 1981, he and a partner bought a two-thirds stake in the small specialty coffee roasting company in Waitsfield, Vermont, that produced the roasted beans. The store and café sold beans, grounds, and coffee to the public and a few restaurants. Stiller dedicated himself to coffee-roasting, using arabica coffee beans. By 1982, the company had around 30 employees, and moved its production facilities to Waterbury, Vermont.

Stiller bought out his two partners for $100,000 and became sole proprietor of the company within two years of his original purchase, but it took four years to turn a profit. To grow the business, Stiller sold the coffee to high-end restaurants and gas stations alike, and gave out free samples as he could not afford advertising. In 1986, he launched a mail-order business which he advertised in gourmet magazines, and acquired his first supermarket-chain customer, Kings.

Stiller adopted technology to track customers' orders; to regulate roasting-heat levels appropriate to each bag; and to track distribution, manufacturing, sales, and personnel (adopting PeopleSoft in 1997). By 1983, employees composted used coffee grounds at its retail stores, and by 1986, Green Mountain introduced its first organic coffee in a retail market test. The company became one of the largest suppliers of double-certified fair-trade and organic coffee in the world.

As American tastes in coffee changed, sales of Green Mountain roasted coffee beans grew. In 1991, GMCR had seven retail outlets, 1,000 wholesale clients, $11 million in sales, and $200,000 in profits. By 1993, the company had 2,400 wholesale accounts and sales of about $10 million, and Green Mountain Coffee Roasters, Inc. started trading publicly, under the ticker "GMCR". The company expanded its retail locations, food-service distribution, mail-order business, and wholesale business.

In 1994, Green Mountain began exporting to Canada and Taiwan. In the late 1990s, it broadened its national supermarket chain distribution, gas-station and convenience-store distribution throughout the northeast, and it sold its product in airlines and Amtrak, specialty coffee stores, and venues such as LL Bean, Weight Watchers International, and Staples.

Keurig and launch of K-Cups
In 1993, three engineering entrepreneurs from a Massachusetts start-up called Keurig approached GMCR about developing a single-cup coffee brewing system, marking GMCR's first investment in Keurig. In 1996, GMCR invested further in Keurig, buying a 35% interest in the company. The following year, GMCR became the first roaster to offer coffee in a K-Cup pod for the Keurig Single-Cup Brewing System; in 1998 Keurig delivered its first brewing system, designed for office use. The launch of the first K-Cups with Green Mountain Coffee helped GMCR begin to further compete with the ubiquitous presence of Starbucks, by allowing people to brew their own single servings of premium coffee.

Also in 1997, a deal with Poland Spring opened the office-worker market by distributing Green Mountain Coffee to thousands of offices in the Northeast. In 1998, GMCR closed its 12 retail shops in favor of the burgeoning direct-mail and online market, its growing distributions to business offices and other national venues, and its wholesale market. That year, the company signed an exclusive deal with American Skiing Company, offered its first corporate gifts catalogue, sold its certified organic coffee in ExxonMobil's national and international On the Run convenience stores, and expanded its supermarket distribution to 500 stores. In 1999, it expanded its export market, including to Great Britain.

In 2000, Green Mountain reached an agreement to promote and sell fair trade coffee, committing to making at least 3% of its sales fair trade—certified by TransFair USA. In 2001, the company acquired Frontier Organic Coffee, and in 2002, it signed an agreement to sell fair trade coffee under the Newman's Own Organics label. In late 2005, GMCR reached a deal to sell its Newman's Own Organics Blend coffee in more than 600 McDonald's restaurants in New England and Upstate New York.

Acquisition of Keurig, Inc.
In 2006, Green Mountain—which had successively invested in and acquired increasing percentage ownership of Keurig, Inc. in 1993, 1996, and 2003, by which time it had a 43% ownership—completed its full acquisition of the single-cup brewing systems manufacturer. The successive acquisition allowed Green Mountain to adopt a multi-brand portfolio, and multichannel distribution of brands in a variety of settings. It also fueled substantial revenue growth, and allowed GMCR to transition fully from deriving 95% of its revenue from its low-margin wholesale coffee business in the late 1990s (approximately $65 million), to deriving 95% of its revenue from high-margin sales of K-Cups as of 2014 (more than $4.3 billion).

Green Mountain also acquired the four additional Keurig licensees in 2009 and 2010:

 In March 2009, it purchased Seattle-based Tully's Coffee brand and its wholesale coffee business for $40.3 million.
 In November 2009, it acquired the wholesale division of Canadian coffee provider Timothy's World Coffee for $157 million.
 In December 2009, it purchased the California-based Diedrich Coffee for $290 million.
 In 2010, Green Mountain Coffee bought the Canadian distributor, Quebec-based coffee services company Van Houtte, for $915 million.  In 2010, GMCR Canada was founded, and officially became the Canadian Business Unit of Green Mountain Coffee Roasters, Inc. the following year. (It has been known as Keurig Canada Inc. since March 2014, and now Keurig Dr Pepper Canada.)

On September 28, 2010, GMCR's stock rose to what was then an all-time high; however, the company disclosed after the markets closed that the Securities and Exchange Commission (SEC) had requested documents and data related to an inquiry into how it accounted for revenue. The company announced that U.S. regulators had inquired into some of Green Mountain's accounting practices, including revenue recognition, and the large inventory with a single vendor, M. Block and Sons, Inc. Most analysts felt that the company practices were sound. The SEC ended the probe in October 2014, and brought no enforcement action against Green Mountain or its employees.

In February 2011, Green Mountain announced an agreement with Dunkin' Donuts to make Dunkin’ Donuts coffee available in single-serve K-Cup pods for use with Keurig Single-Cup Brewers. In addition, participating Dunkin’ Donuts restaurants on occasion offer Keurig Single-Cup Brewers for sale. In March 2011, Green Mountain Coffee and Starbucks announced a similar deal whereby the latter would sell its coffee and tea in Keurig single-serve pods, and would in return sell Keurig machines in their stores as part of the deal.

New brewers, and company name change
Green Mountain Coffee Roasters introduced the Keurig Vue brewer, paired with new Vue packs, in February 2012, seven months before patents on the K-Cup expired in September 2012. The Vue system was announced as having customizable features so consumers had control over the strength, size, and temperature of their beverages, and the Vue pack is made of recyclable #5 plastic. In November 2012, GMCR released its espresso, cappuccino, and latte brewer, the Rivo, co-developed with the Italian coffee company Lavazza. In the fall of 2013, the company released a full-pot brewer, the Keurig Bolt, for use mainly in offices.

In February 2014, The Coca-Cola Company purchased a 10% stake in the company, valued at $1.25 billion, with an option to increase their stake to 16%, which was exercised in May 2014. The partnership was part of Coca-Cola's support of a cold beverage system to be developed by Keurig that allows customers to make Coca-Cola and other brand soft drinks at home.  In January 2015, the company made a similar deal with Dr Pepper Snapple Group, but without a stockholder stake.

In early March 2014, Green Mountain Coffee Roasters shareholders voted to change its name to Keurig Green Mountain to reflect its business of selling Keurig coffee makers. Its stock-market symbol remained "GMCR".

In the fall of 2014, Keurig Green Mountain introduced the Keurig 2.0 brewer, with technology to prevent old or unlicensed pods being used in the brewer. The digital lock-out sparked hacking attempts and antitrust lawsuits. The 2.0 brewer also has the capacity to brew full carafes in addition to single servings, via the use of the new K-Carafe portion pack.

In March 2015, it launched the K-Mug pod, a recyclable pod which brews large travel mug–sized portions. In mid 2015 Keurig debuted the K200, a smaller Keurig 2.0 model that can brew single cups or four-cup carafes and comes in a variety of colors. General Electric announced that its new Café French Door refrigerator, due out in late 2015, would have a Keurig coffee machine built into the door.

In September 2015, Keurig launched a line of Campbell's Soup available in K-Cups. The kits come with a packet of noodles and a K-Cup pod of soup, and the varieties include Chicken Noodle and Southwest Style Chicken Noodle.

Also in September 2015, Keurig launched Keurig Kold, a brewer which created a variety of cold beverages including soft drinks, functional beverages, and sparkling waters. The machine brewed beverages from The Coca-Cola Company and the Dr Pepper Snapple Group, in addition to Keurig's own line of flavored sparkling and non-sparkling waters and teas, sports drinks, and soda-fountain drinks. The company's primary competitor in this market area was SodaStream. In June 2016 Keurig announced it was discontinuing the machine and offered refunds to purchasers.

Acquisition by JAB and other investors 
On December 7, 2015, an investor group led by private-equity firm JAB Holding Company—an investment firm dealing in high-end consumer goods, whose holdings include Peet's Coffee & Tea—announced its intent to acquire Keurig Green Mountain for $13.9 billion. The minority investors in the KGM purchase included shareholders in the global coffee and tea company Jacobs Douwe Egberts, which owns Tassimo. The agreement was unanimously approved by Keurig Green Mountain's board of directors.

The selling price, at $92 per share, represented a 77.9% premium over the closing price of Keurig Green Mountain (stock ticker "GMCR") on December 5, 2015. The Coca-Cola Company, Keurig Green Mountain's largest shareholder at 17.4%, announced its support for the JAB takeover since the sale of its stock holding would provide Coca-Cola with a substantial financial benefit.

The acquisition closed in March 2016. Keurig Green Mountain became a privately held company, and remained an independent entity run by its existing management team, retaining its head office in Waterbury, Vermont. In a statement, JAB's chairman Bart Becht said that "Keurig Green Mountain will operate as an independent entity.... The company’s management team...will continue to run Keurig."

Acquisition of Dr Pepper Snapple Group 

In July 2018, Keurig Green Mountain acquired Dr Pepper Snapple Group in a deal worth $18.7 billion. Legally, Dr Pepper Snapple Group was the surviving company; it remained publicly traded and changed its name to Keurig Dr Pepper. This created the third largest beverage company in North America. On July 10, shares in Keurig Dr Pepper (KDP) began trading on the New York Stock Exchange. Its stock switched to NASDAQ in 2020. Dr Pepper Snapple Group continues to operate as a business unit under the Keurig Dr Pepper parent company.

Corporate affairs

Sustainability
GMCR began to embrace an environmental ethos within two years of its founding, and environmentalism and sustainability were overarching policies for which Green Mountain became well known. Among other initiatives within Green Mountain's first decade, in 1983 employees began composting used coffee grounds at its retail stores; in 1986 the company introduced its first organic coffee in a retail market test; in 1989 it formed an Employee Environmental Committee, and began a recycling program; and in 1990 it introduced Rain Forest Nut coffee to sponsor rainforest preservation, donating 10% of the product's profits to Conservation International and the Rainforest Alliance, and it introduced the first earth-friendly, oxygen-whitened, dioxin-free coffee filters. In 1992 it formed a Stewardship Program to promote sustainability and sound environmental practices; in 1997 it pioneered the first biodegradable bag for bulk coffee purchases; and in 2006 it introduced the ecotainer, a to-go cup for hot beverages made entirely out of renewable materials.

In 2005, Green Mountain was the first coffee company to support the United Nations' Global Reporting Initiative mission to develop globally accepted sustainability reporting guidelines. In 2008 GMCR's board of directors added a social and environmental responsibility committee. During that time period GMCR also established a vice president for environmental affairs reporting directly to the CEO. As of 2015, Keurig Green Mountain has a Chief Sustainability Officer.

The company offsets 100% of its direct greenhouse gases, and prioritizes waste reduction and responsible energy use, and sustainability over the life-cycle of its products. In addition to other awards and recognition for sustainable practices, GMCR was on Sustainable Businesss "World's Top 20 Sustainable Business Stocks" annually from 2002 to 2007, and as of 2015 it is on the EPA's National Top 100 of green power users in the U.S. In 2014, Keurig Green Mountain announced a multi-faceted effort to address the long-term challenges of the global water crisis, and instituted an initial commitment of $11 million to support nonprofits working to promote water security.

Environmental advocates and journalists have criticized the company for the billions of non-recyclable and non-biodegradable K-Cups consumers purchase and dispose of every year, and for the dichotomy between the company's historic environmentally conscious image and the impact of K-Cups on the environment. GMCR's vice president of sustainability stated in 2013 that "The system has a lot of pretty demanding technical requirements in terms of being able to withstand certain amount of temperature and to have a certain kind of rigidity, and provide the right kinds of moisture barriers and oxygen barriers and the like. So it isn't the simplest challenge." In 2015, the company's chief sustainability officer stated that every new K-Cup spin-off product introduced since 2006 – including the Vue, Bolt, and K-Carafe cups – is recyclable if disassembled into paper, plastic, and metal components. In its 2014 Sustainability Report, released in February 2015, Keurig Green Mountain re-affirmed that a priority for the company is ensuring that 100% of K-Cup pods are recyclable by 2020.

Corporate social responsibility
From its inception, and in tandem with its environmentally conscious outlook, Green Mountain has had a culture grounded in social responsibility, community mindedness, philanthropy, and respect for employees. Among other recognition and awards for its corporate social responsibility (CSR), GMCR was in the top ten of the "100 Best Corporate Citizens" each year from 2003 to 2007, and was ranked #1 in 2006 and 2007. GMCR was not under consideration for the ranking in 2008, because the focus switched to exclusively large-cap companies. It re-entered the "100 Best Corporate Citizens" list in 2010 and 2013. In 2005, Green Mountain released its first Corporate Social Responsibility Report. In 2008 GMCR's board of directors added a social and environmental responsibility committee overseeing the company's social responsibilities. It also established a vice president for corporate social responsibility who reports directly to the CEO. In addition to its environmental oversight, the company's Sustainability Committee focuses on areas including the financial and environmental viability, health, and resiliency of its coffee-growing and manufacturing supply chains; community outreach; and corporate and employee social responsibility and awareness.

GMCR was a pioneer in the Fair Trade movement in 2000, guaranteeing farmers a steady minimum price far above market value. Since 2010 Green Mountain has been the largest purchaser of Fair Trade coffee in the world. In addition, the company was from its beginnings known for its long-term relationships and fair dealings with coffee-growing suppliers, and for its large percentage of farmer-direct coffee purchases. Since the early 1990s, the company has annually sent groups of employees on trips to coffee farms in Latin America, to gain first-hand experience in the lives of coffee growers. GMCR has prioritized initiatives to alleviate poverty and hunger in coffee-growing communities. These include Coffee Kids, an international non-profit which improves the lives of children and families in remote coffee-growing villages; and the FomCafe cooperative's quality-control training program, which helps farmers earn higher profits for coffee. In 2002 GMCR was the first corporate investor of the non-profit micro-loan organization Root Capital, and through it Green Mountain has provided millions of dollars in loans to cash-strapped coffee farmers. In 2002 Green Mountain also formed a joint alliance with the U.S. Agency for International Development, to improve the livelihoods of those in impoverished coffee-growing regions.

Internally, GMCR has cultivated and maintained a flat corporate culture, where employee buy-in, enthusiasm and vision, collaboration, and input is important. The company offers employees continuous training and development opportunities; tuition for outside education; profit-sharing; financial education; and continuous career-advancement support. Employees are paid for up to 52 hours of volunteer work in their community per year. GMCR has been on Forbes list of Best Small Companies five times, and has been recognized as a "Best Place to Work" in HR Magazine.

Business segments and brands
Keurig Green Mountain operates in two business segments: domestic and Canada. The domestic segment produces and sells coffee, hot cocoa, teas and other beverages, to be prepared hot or cold, in Keurig pods; it also sells coffee in traditional packaging, including whole beans and ground coffee in bags, and ground coffee in fractional packs.  It also sells patented Keurig single-cup brewing systems for use both at home and away from home.

The Canadian business unit – Keurig Canada Inc. – sells Keurig brewers, and produces and sells coffees, teas, and other beverages in a variety of packaging formats, including Keurig pods, as well as coffee in traditional packaging such as bags, cans, and fractional packs. It sells under a variety of brands, including Van Houtte, Brulerie St. Denis, Brulerie Mont-Royal, and Orient Express, and its licensed Bigelow and Wolfgang Puck brands.

Through its owned brands and through its partnerships and licensing, Keurig Green Mountain's K-Cup pods offer more than 400 varieties of coffee, tea, and other beverages from 60 brands, including the top ten best-selling coffee brands in the U.S.

Corporate governance
Founder Bob Stiller was president and CEO of the company from its inception in 1981 until 2007, when he stepped down but remained chairman until May 2012. Lawrence J. Blanford became Green Mountain's president and CEO in 2007. Brian Kelley, previously chief product supply officer of Coca-Cola Refreshments, became the company's president and CEO in December 2012.

In March 2016, JAB Holding Company and other investors acquired Keurig Green Mountain. Robert Gamgort, previously CEO of Pinnacle Foods, took over as KGM's new CEO in May 2016. The pre-existing management team, with Gamgort as its new CEO, continued to run Keurig Green Mountain as an independent entity, following its acquisition by JAB Holding Company. Following the 2018 merger with Dr Pepper Snapple, Gamgort became CEO of Keurig Dr Pepper, and Larry Young, who had been president and CEO of Dr Pepper Snapple, retired from those positions and joined the new company's board of directors.

Brands 

 50/50
 7 Up (U.S. only)
 A&W Root Beer (worldwide except Canada)
 A&W Cream Soda
 Bai Brands
 Cactus Cooler
 Canada Dry
 Sussex Golden
 Core Brands (Water/Fitness Nutrition)
 Crush
 Dejà Blue
 Diedrich Coffee
 Dr Pepper (U.S. only)
 Gloria Jean's Coffees
 Green Mountain Coffee
 Hawaiian Punch (U.S. only)
 Hires Root Beer
 IBC Root Beer
 Keurig
 K-Cups
 Mott's
 Clamato
 Mr & Mrs T
 Peet's Coffee
 Peñafiel
 ReaLemon and ReaLime
 RC Cola (U.S. only)
 Diet Rite
 Nehi
 Rose's
 Schweppes (North America)
 Snapple
 Squirt
 Stewart's Fountain Classics
 Straight Up Tea
 Sun Drop
 Sunkist
 Timothy's World Coffee
 Tully's Coffee
 Van Houtte
 Venom Energy
 Vernors
 Yoo-hoo

References

External links

 
Coffee brands
Companies based in Burlington, Massachusetts
Food and drink companies based in Massachusetts
Food and drink companies established in 1981
1981 establishments in Vermont
Drink companies of the United States
2016 mergers and acquisitions
2018 mergers and acquisitions
Soft drinks manufacturers
Multinational food companies